Angela Palacious (born 1953) is a Bahamian Christian minister. She was the first woman deacon and the first woman priest of the Anglican Diocese of The Bahamas and the Turks and Caicos Islands.

Biography
Angela C. Bosfield was born in 1953 born in Nassau, Bahamas. She obtained a BA in English from Durham University in England in 1975 and went on to earn an MA in English from Concordia University of Montreal, Quebec, Canada in 1978. In 1981, she and her husband, James Palacious were both students at Princeton. In 1984, Palacious completed her Master of Divinity and the following year a Master of Theology from Princeton Theological Seminary in New Jersey.

Career 
She returned to the Bahamas and became an elementary school teacher, teaching at St Matthew's Primary School in Nassau and serving as a part-time guidance counsellor at the Governor's Harbour High School on Eleuthera. Palacious also served as a layperson at St. Patrick's Church on Eleuthera and at St. Matthew's Church  in Nassau. In 1992, the Anglican diocese agreed to allow women's ordination and the following year, Palacious applied to become a deacon. She went to New York to further her training and in 1994, she earned a Certificate in Anglican Studies from the General Theological Seminary in Manhattan. On 11 May 1999 Palacious was ordained as the first woman deacon in the Anglican Diocese of Nassau's 138-year history, and she and her husband, who at the time was rector of St. Matthew's Church, became the first ordained husband and wife team in the region. From 1999 to 2000 Palacious served as the Coordinator of the Diocese, and on 31 May 2000 was ordained as the first Bahamian woman Anglican priest of the Diocese of The Bahamas and the Turks and Caicos Islands.

Since her ordination, she has served as the assistant curate of St. Matthew's Church, and as the assistant Priest of St. Mary the Virgin Church and St. Margaret's Church. Between 2000 and 2010, she served as the diocesan ministry coordinator. Palacious has had many volunteer positions and served on the boards of numerous organizations. She has written 8 books. Her husband is now the Anglican Archdeacon and they have one son, who is a coastal and civil engineer.

Selected works

References

Bibliography 

 

1953 births
Living people
Bahamian Anglican priests
Concordia University alumni
Princeton Theological Seminary alumni
Women Christian clergy
20th-century women writers
20th-century writers
21st-century women writers
People from Nassau, Bahamas
Bahamian women writers
People from Eleuthera
Christian clergy in the Bahamas
Alumni of St Hild's College, Durham